Xyroptila falciformis is a moth of the family Pterophoridae. It is found in south-western New Guinea.

References

External links

Moths described in 2006
Moths of New Guinea
falciformis